The 2018 Chooks-to-Go PSL Invitational Cup was the third conference and second indoor volleyball tournament of the Philippine Super Liga's sixth season. The tournament commenced on June 23, 2018 at the Smart Araneta Coliseum, Quezon City. As with the 2017 Invitational, the tournament used an all-to-play format to give playing time for every player in each team.

Teams

Preliminary round

Group A

|}

|}

Group B

|}

|}

Playoffs

Quarterfinals

|}

9th place

|}

7th place

|}

5th place

|}

Semifinals

|}

Bronze match

|}

Finals

|}

Final standing

Individual awards

Tune-up games with the Philippine national team
The Philippines women's national volleyball team that will participate in the 2018 Asian Games in Indonesia on August 18–September 2, 2018 will be a guest team in the tournament. The team will play tune up games against some of the regular PSL teams. National players will play for their respective mother teams in games pitting the Philippine team against their mother team. Alyssa Valdez and Jia Morado will not play for the national team in the PSL tune up games due to obligations with their mother team, the Creamline Cool Smashers in the ongoing 2018 Premier Volleyball League Reinforced Conference.

|}

Venues
Smart Araneta Coliseum (opening day)
Filoil Flying V Arena (main venue)
Cuneta Astrodome (secondary venue)

"Spike on Tour" Venues:
Cadiz Arena (July 3)
Muntinlupa Sports Complex (July 14, 21)

Broadcast partners
ESPN 5: The 5 Network, AksyonTV, Hyper (SD and HD), ESPN5.com

References

External links
PSL website

Invitational
2018 in women's volleyball
PSL